Dinophysis ovum is a species of toxic dinoflagellates suspected to cause diarrhetic shellfish poisoning in humans.

Further reading

 whoi.edu

Dinophyceae